Floriano may refer to:

People

Surname
 Francisco Floriano (born 1959), Brazilian politician
 Roberto Floriano (born 1986), Italian footballer
 Floriano Abrahamowicz (born 1961), Austrian priest

Given name
 Floriano Ambrosini (1557–1621), Italian architect and engineer
 Floriano Buroni, 17th-century Italian engraver
 Floriano Ferramola (c. 1478–1528), Italian painter
 Floriano Martello (born 1952), Italian speed skater
 Floriano Peixoto (1839–1895), Brazilian president
 Floriano Peixoto (actor) (born 1959), Brazilian actor
 Floriano Spiess (born 1967), Brazilian wrestler
 Floriano Vanzo (born 1994), Belgian footballer

Other uses
 Floriano, Piauí, Brazil
 Roman Catholic Diocese of Floriano, based in the city in Piauí
 Floriano (horse), a horse ridden by Steffen Peters in dressage
 San Floriano, a hamlet in Deutschnofen, South Tyrol, Italy

See also
 Floriano Peixoto (disambiguation)
 Floriano River (disambiguation)
 Florian (disambiguation)
 Florianópolis, the capital of Santa Catarina, Brazil

Italian-language surnames
Portuguese masculine given names
Spanish masculine given names